Phil Cullen (born 1943 in Bennettsbridge, County Kilkenny) is an Irish retired sportsperson.  He played hurling with his local club Bennettsbridge and was a member of the Warwickshire and Kilkenny senior inter-county teams in the 1960s and 1970s.

References

1943 births
Living people
Bennettsbridge hurlers
Kilkenny inter-county hurlers